Lisowo  (formerly ), is a village in the administrative district of Gmina Chociwel, within Stargard County, West Pomeranian Voivodeship, in north-western Poland.

The village has a population of 344.

There is a church of Our Lady of Częstochowa in the village.

Between 1871 and 1945 the area was part of Germany. For the history of the region, see History of Pomerania.

References

Lisowo